Silviella may refer to:
 Silviella (beetle), a genus of beetles in the family Cleridae
 Silviella (plant), a genus of plants in the family Orobanchaceae
 Silviella, a settlement in Spain (:eswiki)